The decade of the 1320s in art involved some significant events.

Events

Art

 1320: Église Notre-Dame de l'Assomption, Bergheim begun
 1322–1326: Simone Martini completes fresco depicting Saint Clare of Assisi in Lower basilica of San Francesco, Assisi
 1328: Giotto Baroncelli – Altarpiece Polyptych, Baroncelli Chapel, Basilica di Santa Croce, Florence
 1329:
 Pietro Lorenzetti – Carmelite polyptych, and The Prophet Elisha
 Lorenzo Maitani – The Eagle: Symbol of St John sculpture
 Andrea Pisano commissioned to design bronze doors for the Florence Baptistery

Births
 1325: Puccio Capanna – Italian painter of the first half of the 14th century, who lived and worked in Assisi
 1325: Niccolò da Bologna – Italian manuscript illuminator (died 1403)
 1324: Giottino – Italian painter from Florence (died 1369)
 1322: Matteo Giovanetti – Italian religious-themed fresco painter (died 1368)
 1320: Giusto de' Menabuoi – Italian painter of the early Renaissance (died 1391)
 1320: Gennaro di Cola –  Italian Trecento painter active mainly in Naples (died 1370)

Deaths
 1328: Li Shixing – Chinese landscape painter during the Yuan Dynasty (born 1282)
 1327: Ren Renfa – Chinese painter of horses, people, flowers and birds (born 1254)
 1325: Filippo Rusuti –  Italian painter and mosaicist (born 1255)
 1322: Zhao Mengfu – Chinese scholar, painter and calligrapher during the Yuan Dynasty (born 1254)
 1320: Li Kan – Chinese painter during the Yuan Dynasty (born 1245)
 1320: Filippo Tesauro – Italian painter active mainly in Naples (born 1260)

 
Years of the 14th century in art
Art